Zavos is a surname. Notable people with the surname include:

Panayiotis Zavos (born 1944), Cypriot-American physiologist
Spiro Zavos (born 1937),  Australasian historian, philosopher, journalist, and writer